Nelya Neporadna (born 29 July 1985 in Ivano-Frankivsk Oblast) is a Ukrainian middle distance runner who specializes in the 1500 metres.

She finished eleventh at the 2003 World Championships in Paris and won the 2004 World Junior Championships in Grosseto.

Her personal best time is 4:03.73 minutes, achieved in June 2005 in Athens.

External links

1985 births
Living people
Ukrainian female middle-distance runners
Athletes (track and field) at the 2004 Summer Olympics
Olympic athletes of Ukraine